Vasyl Kravchuk (born 26 July 1996) is a Ukrainian cross-country skier and biathlete.

Career
He represented Ukraine at the 2022 Winter Paralympics and won a gold medal in the 4 × 2.5 kilometre open relay.

References 

Living people
1996 births
Cross-country skiers at the 2022 Winter Paralympics
Paralympic biathletes of Ukraine
Paralympic cross-country skiers of Ukraine
Paralympic gold medalists for Ukraine
Medalists at the 2022 Winter Paralympics
Paralympic medalists in cross-country skiing
Ukrainian male cross-country skiers
Ukrainian male biathletes
Sportspeople from Lviv Oblast
21st-century Ukrainian people